The 2008 Toyota/Save Mart 350 was the sixteenth race of the 2008 NASCAR Sprint Cup season, and the first of two scheduled road course races on the 2008 schedule.  The event was held on Sunday, June 22, 2008, at Infineon Raceway at Sears Point in Sonoma, California, televised on TNT starting at 3:30 PM US EDT, and broadcast on radio via Sirius Satellite Radio and Performance Racing Network starting at 4 PM US EDT.

Pre-Race News 

It was announced by Joe Gibbs Racing that 18-year-old Joey Logano, who won the Nationwide Series Meijer 300 at Kentucky Motor Speedway one week earlier will attempt to drive in several late-season Sprint Cup races.
The biannual rite of road course ringers replacing regular drivers happened as per custom this week at Infineon Raceway.  Among this week's changes among those already locked into the Top 35, Scott Pruett replaced Reed Sorenson in the #41 Chip Ganassi Racing Dodge starting 28th and Dale Earnhardt, Inc. employed Canadian Ron Fellows in the #01 Chevrolet for Regan Smith, starting 22nd. Four drivers - Italian Max Papis, who drove the #66 Haas CNC Racing Chevrolet in the 28th slot for Scott Riggs, who transferred to the #70 ride this week, and failed to make the race; Brian Simo drove Front Row Motorsports' #34 car, which switched from Chevrolet to Ford for No Fear Racing, and started 43rd ("Shotgun on the field"); Aussie Marcos Ambrose in the #21 Wood Brothers Ford, who started seventh and Boris Said in the No Fear Racing #60 Ford who will started 14th - made the race in the knockout phase of the qualifying.
Kyle Busch will solely concentrate on trying to win the 2008 Sprint Cup championship, abandoning racing separate events in the Nationwide Series and the Craftsman Truck Series unless they are in conjunction with Sprint Cup events.

Race notes

The Australian rookie Marcos Ambrose had his first NASCAR Cup race/start in this race. He started 7th and the NASCAR Cup world noticed him. When Marcos Ambrose came to Sonoma to race, the fans and drivers remembered him for him being crashed by Robby Gordon in 2007 at Montreal with 2 laps left. Marcos Ambrose because of his road course talent & good finishes in the Busch series in his past, qualified seventh; and was contending to win in his Wood Bros. #21 Chevy. However, with 25 laps left, NASCAR veteran Elliott Sadler tapped Marcos Ambrose who crashed and was damaged enough that he could not race anymore that day. Marcos Ambrose was really unhappy about the end of his good run and in post-race ceremonies he argued with Elliott Sadler in the garages. Ambrose said to reporters that he felt like beating Elliott Sadler for the tap but he got over it the next week after a call/apology from Sadler. Marcos finished in 42nd spot as a heartbreak for his first NASCAR Cup run.

Italian driver Max Papis also had one of his first NASCAR Cup races at Sonoma. He drove for Gene Haas' (Now Stewart-Haas) #66 Automation chevy and ended up in 35th spot.

The 2008 Toyota/Save Mart 350 also had one of NASCAR's largest numbers of road course drivers competing in the races with 8 drivers (Ron Fellows, Marcos Ambrose, Patrick Carpentier, Boris Said, Scott Pruett, Sam Hornish, Brian Simo, Robby Gordon).

Qualifying 
Kasey Kahne, who went out third in qualifying won the session, his second this season. Kahne, driver of the #9 Gillett Evernham Motorsports Budweiser Dodge had bettered Dale Earnhardt Jr.'s time, and then sweated out 44 other attempts to sit on P-1.  Jimmie Johnson started next to Kahne on the front row, with Kurt Busch and Bobby Labonte in the second row, followed by Jeff Gordon and Elliott Sadler in the third row.

OP: qualified via owners points

PC: qualified as past champion

PR: provisional

QR: via qualifying race

* - had to qualify on time

Failed to Qualify: J. J. Yeley (#96), Scott Riggs (#70), Dario Franchitti (#40), Brandon Ash (#02)

Race recap 

Kyle Busch came from the 30th starting position to win the race under a green-white-checker finish, the second furthest back in this race to win, bettering Juan Pablo Montoya's position one year earlier.

Results 

NOTE: Race extended two laps due to green-white checker finish.

References 

Toyota Save Mart 350
Toyota Save Mart 350
NASCAR races at Sonoma Raceway